The Fisker Ocean is a luxury crossover SUV produced by Fisker to be launched in 2023. It is first of three in a lineup of mass-market all-electric vehicles designed by Henrik Fisker. The SUV will be offered in both rear and all-wheel drive.

Overview
On October 15, 2020, Fisker announced it would be outsourcing vehicle production of the Ocean to Magna Steyr, an Austrian-based manufacturer that specializes in contract manufacturing, in order to reduce the complexities and costs related to the building and operating its own factory. Fisker plans on utilizing Magna's electric vehicle platform, and will be giving Magna a stake of up to 6% of Fisker equity. In June 2021, Fisker finalized its manufacturing deal with Magna Steyr, with production on the Fisker Ocean to begin in November 2022 at Magna's facility in Graz, Austria.

In October 2020, Viggo, a newly-founded Danish ride-hailing service, ordered 300 Fisker Oceans, to be delivered in late 2022. In March 2021, Fisker announced an agreement with Crédit Agricole Consumer Finance (of Crédit Agricole Group) on the potential supply of Fisker Ocean SUVs to the European banking group. In May 2021, Fisker announced an agreement with UK electric car subscription service Onto to supply the company with up to 700 Fisker Ocean SUVs in 2023. In November 2021, Fisker and Contemporary Amperex Technology (CATL) announced a deal for CATL to supply battery packs for the Fisker Ocean SUV. CATL will provide two different battery packs for the vehicle. The primary high-capacity pack uses a lithium nickel manganese cobalt cell chemistry, and the second pack uses CATL's cells based on lithium-ion phosphate chemistry. In February 2022, the Fisker Ocean made its European market debut at Mobile World Congress in Barcelona. As of February 2022, the company announced that it has over 30,000 reservations for the Fisker Ocean SUV and over 55,000 by August 2022. At the end of 2022, the Ocean had 63,000 preorders.

References

External links

Cars introduced in 2021
Mid-size sport utility vehicles
Electric cars
Electric car models
Production electric cars
Crossover sport utility vehicles